The Clube Atlético Mineiro Youth Squads are the youth academy of Clube Atlético Mineiro, a Brazilian football club based in Belo Horizonte. The youth sector is composed of various squads divided by age groups. All the youth teams currently train at the club's main training ground, Cidade do Galo, located in the municipality of Vespasiano. The U-20 squad currently plays in the Campeonato Brasileiro Sub-20, the Copa do Brasil Sub-20 and the Copa São Paulo de Futebol Júnior. Atlético Mineiro's Youth Squads of all categories have won trophies at national and international level.

Some of the senior members of the U20 team also eventually play for Atlético Mineiro's first squad. As of June 2021, the current head coach of the U-20 squad (Júnior) Marcos Valadares. Lucas Batista coaches the U-17 (Juvenil) squad, the Infantil category (U-15) is coached by Filipe Mattos and the U-14 is coached by Rodolfo Paz. Erasmo Damiani oversees the overall youth development setup at the club as Director.

Structure
Atlético Mineiro's youth sector operates in Cidade do Galo, the main training facility for the club. It has a hotel able to host 90 youths, in 19 quadruple apartments and 12 triple ones. The youth facilities include a gym, a restaurant, a pedagogy room, a library, a gaming room, an auditorium with a 150 capacity, an Internet café, and departments for medicine, dentistry and physiotherapy. The youths are able to live in the facility and receive medical and educational assistance from the club.

The club's main youth squad is the U-20, called Júnior, which includes athletes aging 17 to 20. The Juvenil category is the U-17 squad. Players with 15 years old and less are categorised under the Infantil.

Current squads

U20 Squad (Júnior)

U17 Squad (Juvenil)

Staff

General 
 Youth squads director: Erasmo Damiani
 Supervisor: Carlos Alberto

Júnior squad (U-20) 
 Head coach: Marcos Valadares
 Fitness coach: Leonardo Almeida
 Goalkeeping coach: Rafael César
 Masseur: Fabrício Carvalho
 Kit man: Gilvan da Silva

Juvenil squad (U-17) 
 Head coach: Lucas Batista
 Assistant coach: Vladimir Freitas
 Fitness coach: Guilherme Esteves
 Goalkeeping coach: Elano Berto
 Masseur: Ademilson dos Santos
 Kit man: Neuro Lima

Infantil squad (U-15) 
 Supervisor: Ademar Gonzaga
 Head coach: Filipe Matos
 Assistant coach: João Alves
 Fitness Coach: Thalles Bemfica
 Goalkeeping coach: Lincoln Oliveira
 Masseur: Moisés Costa
 Kit man: Warley Ribeiro

U-14 
 Supervisor: Ademar Gonzaga
 Head coach: Rodolfo Paz
 Assistant coach: Lucas Toribio
 Fitness Coach: Junio Almeida
 Goalkeeping coach: Tales Superbi
 Masseur: Rodolfo Evangelista
 Kit man: Douglas Magnum

Honours

National 
Campeonato Brasileiro U-20: 1
2020
Copa do Brasil U-20: 1
2017
Copa São Paulo de Futebol Júnior (U-20): 3
1975, 1976, 1982
Taça Belo Horizonte de Juniores (U-20): 5 (record)
1988, 1989, 2005, 2009, 2011
Copa do Brasil U-17: 1
2014
Copa Santiago de Futebol Juvenil (U-17): 1
2006
Copa do Brasil U-15: 1
2015

International 
 Terborg Tournament (U-20): 3
2006, 2008, 2016
 Kvarnerska Rivijera (U-19): 2
2003, 2004
 ICGT Youth Tournament (U-19): 3
2003, 2004
 Spax Cup (Ennepetal Tournament) (U-19): 3
2005, 2008, 2014
 Future Champions Tournament (U-17): 5 (record)
2010, 2011 (I), 2011 (II), 2012, 2014
 Torneo Internazionale Città di Gradisca (U-17): 4 (record)
2004, 2006, 2007, 2008
 BH Youth Cup (U-15): 2
2009, 2011

Notable graduates
List of former Clube Atlético Mineiro youth squads graduates who have played matches at full international level for the Brazil national team.

References

External links
Atlético Mineiro Youth Squad on atletico.com.br

Youth Squads
Atletico Mineiro